Watson House is a historic home located at Lockport in Niagara County, New York, USA. It is a two-story stone structure built in 1854 by Thomas Watson, an early settler of Lockport, in the Gothic Revival style. It is one of approximately 75 stone residences remaining in the city of Lockport.

It was listed on the National Register of Historic Places in 2003.

References

External links
Watson House - Lockport, NY - U.S. National Register of Historic Places on Waymarking.com

Houses on the National Register of Historic Places in New York (state)
Gothic Revival architecture in New York (state)
Houses completed in 1854
Houses in Niagara County, New York
National Register of Historic Places in Niagara County, New York